Lush is a 2000 American comedy-drama film written and directed by Mark Gibson and starring Campbell Scott, Jared Harris, Laura Linney and Laurel Holloman.  It is Gibson's directorial debut.

Plot
A professional golfer (Campbell Scott) meets an alcoholic lawyer (Jared Harris) and a divorcée in New Orleans.

Cast
Campbell Scott as Lionel 'Ex' Exley
Jared Harris as W. Firmin Carter
Laura Linney as Rachel Van Dyke
Laurel Holloman as Ashley 'Ash' Van Dyke
Nick Offerman as Gerry 
Don Hood as Har

Reception
The film has a 0% approval rating on Rotten Tomatoes based on 5 reviews.

References

External links
 
 

2000 films
American comedy-drama films
2000 comedy-drama films
2000 directorial debut films
2000s English-language films
2000s American films